Harissa ( harīsa, from Maghrebi Arabic) is a hot chili pepper paste, native to the Maghreb. The main ingredients are roasted red peppers, Baklouti peppers, spices and herbs such as garlic paste, caraway seeds, coriander seeds, cumin and olive oil to carry the oil-soluble flavors. Rose harissa, made with rose petals, is also made. 

Tunisia is the biggest exporter of prepared harissa and UNESCO lists it as part of Tunisia's Intangible Cultural Heritage. The origin of harissa goes back to the importation of chili peppers into Maghrebian cuisine by the Columbian exchange, presumably during the Spanish occupation of Ottoman Tunisia between 1535 and 1574.

Etymology 
The word derives from the Arabic root 'harasa' 'to pound, to break into pieces', referring to pounding chilis.

Consumption and culinary traditions

Algeria
In Algeria, harissa is commonly added to soups, stews, and couscous. Harissa paste can also be used as a rub for meat or eggplants. Another significant producer is Algeria's Annaba Province, which is also a significant consumer. According to cookbook author Martha Rose Shulman, premade harissa tastes rather different from that which is  served in Tunisian and expatriate restaurants.

Israel and Libya
In Israel, harissa is a common topping for sabich and shawarma. 

Filfel chuma, also spelled pilpelshuma, literally "pepper garlic", is the typical chili sauce of Libyan Jewish cuisine which is very similar to the harissa. It is made from powdered sweet and hot peppers and crushed garlic. Other ingredients, such as ground caraway seeds, cumin, lemon juice, and salt are sometimes added. It serves as a condiment and as an ingredient in dishes such as salads, meat, fish, legumes and rice, and egg dishes such as shakshouka.

Morocco
Moroccan cuisine has also adopted harissa, using it as a side condiment for tagines, or sometimes mixed into dishes.

Tunisia 
Recipes for harissa vary according to the household and region.  Variations can include the addition of fermented onions or lemon juice. Prepared harissa is sold in jars, cans, bottles and tubes. Harissa is sometimes described as "Tunisia's main condiment", even "the national condiment of Tunisia", or at least as "the hallmark of Tunisia's fish and meat dishes". In Tunisia, harissa is used as an ingredient in a meat (poultry, beef, goat, or lamb) or fish stew with vegetables, and as a flavoring for couscous. It is also used for lablabi, a chickpea soup, and fricasse.

Tunisia is the biggest exporter of prepared harissa. In 2006, the Tunisian production of harissa was 22,000 tonnes, incorporating about 40,000 tonnes of peppers. Tunisian harissa is often made with Baklouti peppers and chilis grown around Nabeul and Gabès, which are relatively mild, scoring 4,000–5,000 on the Scoville scale. On December 1 2022, UNESCO added "Harissa, knowledge, skills and culinary and social practices" as part of Tunisia's Intangible Cultural Heritage.

See also

 Zhug
 Muhammara
 Ajika
 Chermoula
 Tabil
 Gochujang
 Eros Pista
 Biber salçası
 List of sauces
 Seasoning

References

African cuisine
Tunisian cuisine
Herb and spice mixtures
Algerian cuisine
Arab cuisine
Chili paste
Libyan cuisine
Mediterranean cuisine
Mizrahi Jewish cuisine
Sephardi Jewish cuisine